Ismael Armando La Rosa Fernandini (born March 16, 1977) is a Peruvian actor, known for his roles in telenovelas.

Biography
He was born in San Isidro District, Lima, a descendant of an aristocratic Extremadura family that came to Peru and initially installed in Arequipa. Ismael La Rosa is the oldest son of Armando La Rosa Musante and Maria Milagros Fernandini. He has two brothers, Ignacio and Ivan. In December 2008, he married actress Virna Flores. They have been together since meeting on the set of La Rica Vicky in 1997. On June 4, 2010, the couple's first son, Varek, was born. They currently reside in Miami.

Filmography

References

External links

Official Website

Living people
Male actors from Lima
1977 births
National Agrarian University alumni
Peruvian male stage actors
Peruvian male telenovela actors
20th-century Peruvian male actors
21st-century Peruvian male actors
Peruvian emigrants to the United States